Ryan Walker may refer to:

 Ryan Walker (cartoonist) (1870–1932), American socialist cartoonist for the Appeal to Reason and other publications
 Ryan Walker (rugby league) (born 1986), rugby league footballer
 Ryan Walker (soccer) (born 1974), retired American soccer forward